Davide Chiumiento (born 22 November 1984) is a Swiss footballer who plays as a midfielder.

Early life
Chiumiento was born in Switzerland but spent most of his childhood abroad. His father, Gerardo Chiumiento, was a power tool salesman and plied his trade in Canada, Saudi Arabia and Japan before returning to his home country with his son.

Career

Juventus
Chiumiento began his career in 2004 at Juventus and quickly made an impressive name for himself at the club on his debut coming on as a substitute against Ancona at the age of 19. Chiumiento also played alongside his childhood hero Alessandro Del Piero, stating after the match "This was my dream".

In 2004, he was loaned out to Serie B club Siena to gain more experience. Chiumiento broke into the first-team with 14 apps and contributed to the second division side's promotion.
The following year he was loaned out to French side Le Mans playing 27 Ligue 1 matches scoring one goal. In 2006, he was loaned out to Swiss club BSC Young Boys. After his performances in the Swiss Super League, FC Lucerne showed interest in the player and signed him the following year.

Luzern
Chiumiento signed a three-year contract with FC Luzern in the summer of 2007, for €150,000 transfer fee. Chiumiento scored his first goal for Luzern against FC Basel. Chiumiento scored his first hat-trick against FC Aarau; the match ended 6–0.

Vancouver Whitecaps
Chiumiento signed with Vancouver Whitecaps of the USSF Division 2 Professional League in 2010. He made his USSFD2 debut for Vancouver on 24 September 2010 in a 1–0 loss to Montreal Impact. He signed an MLS contract with the club on 8 March 2011. Chiumiento made his Major League Soccer debut for the Whitecaps on 19 March 2011 against Toronto FC, assisting on two goals in a 4–2 win. He scored only two goals in his time with the Whitecaps, a botched cross against the San Jose Earthquakes on 11 May. His second goal was a cutback by Camilo where he chipped the ball up, spun 360 degrees, and went bar down with his right foot. It was a candidate for MLS Goal of the Year.

FC Zürich
On 11 July 2012, Chiumiento was transferred to FC Zürich for an undisclosed fee. He scored his first goal on 19 August, putting it bottom right, making it 1–1 against Servette FC. He won the 2013–14 Swiss Cup and 2015–16 Swiss Cup with Zürich. In June 2017 his contract was not renewed.

International

Chiumiento was called up as a replacement for Johann Lonfat in Switzerland's UEFA Euro 2004 squad. However, he turned the call-up down as he still had hope of appearing for Italy.

In February 2010, Chiumiento decided to play for Switzerland and made his first appearance for the Swiss national neam in a friendly match against Uruguay after having declined many call-ups. Although his dream was to play for Italy he decided he would play for Switzerland as he has a chance to be a regular in the starting team. Chiumiento was not chosen for the Swiss 2010 FIFA World Cup squad.

Playing style
Chiumiento is referred to as the Swiss Ronaldinho although he idolizes Alessandro Del Piero. He is recognized for his pace, dribbling skills, and playmaking ability. Chiumiento plays preferably as a central attacking midfielder, but can play on both wings, or as a second striker.

Personal life

Davide attended Heiden Primary School in his hometown before moving to Turin, Italy, to attend Scuola Privata Athenaeum. He has a mother, Manuela Chiumiento, and an older brother, Claudio Chiumiento. Davide is fluent in four languages, English, French, Italian, and German. These have all helped him have a successful career in many countries. Davide had a great friendship with former FC Zurich striker, Eric Hassli, in his time in Vancouver, not just off the field, but on it, as many Hassli's goals were set up or created by Chiumiento. Davide was Hassli's best man at his wedding right before he transferred to FC Zurich. Some of his hobbies include spending time with his family and friends, and listening to Latin or Brazilian music, as well as surfing the internet. He is a dual citizen as his father was born in Italy.

References

External links
 
 
 

1984 births
Living people
Association football midfielders
Swiss men's footballers
Italian footballers
Italy under-21 international footballers
Switzerland under-21 international footballers
Switzerland international footballers
Juventus F.C. players
A.C.N. Siena 1904 players
Le Mans FC players
BSC Young Boys players
FC Luzern players
Vancouver Whitecaps (1986–2010) players
Vancouver Whitecaps FC players
FC Zürich players
Ligue 1 players
Serie A players
Expatriate footballers in France
Expatriate soccer players in Canada
Swiss expatriate footballers
Swiss expatriate sportspeople in Canada
Swiss Super League players
USSF Division 2 Professional League players
Major League Soccer players
Swiss people of Italian descent